Interior protection is the general term for the installation of temporary dust and debris containment systems during re-roofing, remodelling, or other construction-related projects. These temporary interior protection systems can be installed in many environments, including manufacturing plants, production facilities, class-A office space, hospitals, schools or warehouses. Interior protection services may include suspended ceilings, construction wall barriers, high structure cleaning and other types of custom applications. Temporary interior protection systems are intended to prevent re-roofing and remodelling dust and debris from cross-contaminating clean room-type environments.[1]

The foundation of any interior protection project is a suspended ceiling, which uses reinforced engineered poly film and innovative installation methods to prevent contamination due to falling dust and debris during re-roofing and remodelling projects. Suspended ceilings are installed before the roof replacement or repair begins, remain in place throughout the project, and are removed upon completion. Suspended ceilings offer security against falling dust and debris and other types of contamination.

Another application of interior protection is the construction of wall barriers. They are used to separate a construction project that produces dust, debris, and/or odour from the rest of business operations. This includes scarifying and re-flooring projects, concrete cutting, remodelling, installation of new equipment, tenant improvements, restoration, and reparation. Temporary construction wall barriers involve installing the poly-engineered film floor to ceiling creating a frameless wall – a protective envelope separating the workplace from the work zone. Construction wall barriers can also be specifically customized to meet project requirements, including doorways, tunnels, person doors, and air filters. While not only preventing dust and debris from spreading, a vertical wall or temporary construction partition also confines contractors to their area, keeps employees safe, and prevents the spread of unwanted odours.

Every re-roofing or remodelling project creates dust and debris. Although the suspended ceiling catches the contamination, another aspect of interior protection is high structure cleaning. High structure cleaning is performed during the takedown of the suspended cover by using hand brooms, brushes, HEPA vacuums and other tools to clean and remove non-adhered dust and debris captured on pipes, ductwork, metal beams, trusses, and other horizontal surfaces. High-structure cleaning services provide additional assurance against site contamination.

In the course of interior protection, numerous situations may arise which require custom applications. A temporary interior protection system can be adapted to unique situations and circumstances, such as zipper doors, curtain walls, and suspended netting.

Special attention needs to be given to safety as related to fire sprinklers when dust protection is installed as a ceiling.

Building engineering
Construction
Industrial hygiene